Matevž Govekar (born 17 April 2000) is a Slovenian racing cyclist, who currently rides for UCI WorldTeam .

Major results
2018
 8th G.P. Eccellenze Valli del Soligo
2021
 1st Mountains classification, In the footsteps of the Romans
 5th Trofeo Matteotti
 5th Gran Premio Sportivi di Poggiana
2022
 1st Stage 4 Vuelta a Burgos
 1st Prologue Istrian Spring Trophy
 National Road Championships
2nd Road race
4th Time trial
 2nd Poreč Trophy
 5th GP Slovenian Istria
 9th Road race, UCI Road World Under-23 Championships

References

External links

2000 births
Living people
Slovenian male cyclists
Sportspeople from Ljubljana